Lewis Clive Scoble (born 27 March 1997), known as Junior Mondal, is an English professional footballer who plays as a winger or striker for  club Darlington. He began his career with Middlesbrough but never appeared for their first team, spent 18 months in the Football League with Forest Green Rovers, and played non-league football for Spennymoor Town, Whitby Town, AFC Fylde and Marske United.

Career

Early life and career
Mondal was born in Normanby, North Yorkshire, and attended St Peter's Catholic College in nearby South Bank. He played youth football for South Park, Boro Rangers and Marton, before joining Middlesbrough's academy as an eleven-year-old. When he left school in 2013 he took up a two-year scholarship with Middlesbrough, and his progress was recognised at international level when he was placed on standby for the England under-17 squad for that year's Nordic Tournament, although he was not called upon.

Mondal signed professional forms in 2014, and while still an under-18, made a few appearances for the under-21 team that won a domestic treble of 2014–15 U21 Premier League Division 2, North Riding Senior Cuphe started in the semi-final but did not appear in the finaland the Development League Cup. He moved up to the under-21 team the following season, and scored three goals from four matches to help Middlesbrough reach the 2015–16 UEFA Youth League knockout phase, but missed a significant part of the season with injury. Mondal made his debut in senior football with three appearances in the 2016–17 EFL Cup, and played in all but two of Middlesbrough's matches in that season's U23 Development League, but was nevertheless released at the end of the campaign.

Mondal trained with Hartlepool United and Aberdeen, but eventually signed for National League North club Spennymoor Town and joined Northern Premier League Premier Division club Whitby Town on dual-registration forms in November 2017. He was an unused substitute for Spennymoor in an FA Trophy match in February 2018, and played regularly for Whitby; according to the Whitby Gazette, "his blistering pace [caused] teams no end of problems." Amid interest from teams at a higher level ahead of the 2018–19 season, which included a trial with Blackpool, Mondal signed a one-year contract with Whitby with an option for a second. He scored freely in the first few weeks of the season, and had eight goals from 23 appearances when he moved on.

Forest Green Rovers
After a trial, Mondal signed an 18-month contract with League Two club Forest Green Rovers, to begin in January 2019. Initially assessed by manager Mark Cooper as "lightning quick [but] probably not one that is ready to go and start a game in the first team", he made his club and Football League debut on 19 January as an 87th-minute substitute in a 2–1 defeat at home to Bury. After four appearances from the bench, Mondal's first league start produced his first league goal, to open the scoring in a 3–0 win against Yeovil Town on 16 February. He ended the season with 18 league appearances and two in the play-off semi-final; in the second leg, Mondal's free kick was headed home by Joseph Mills to tie the scores, but former Forest Green player James Norwood gave Tranmere Rovers the victory. He made 28 appearances in 2019–20, mainly in the first half of the campaign, and was one of eight players released at the end of that season when their contracts expired.

Return to non-League football
A trial with Carlisle United came to nothing, and Mondal signed a one-year contract with AFC Fylde of the National League North in September 2020. He played in 13 matches in all competitions before the season was ended early because of the COVID-19 pandemic. The club chose not to take up their option for a second season, and he was released.

Mondal moved on to another National North club, Darlington, in May 2021, and was one of six debutants in the starting eleven for their first match of the season, a 3–2 defeat at home to Alfreton Town. He was a regular in the matchday squad but rarely started, with Jake Cassidy and the prolific Luke Charman the strike pairing of choice and Kévin dos Santos and Jarrett Rivers preferred on the wings. On 11 January 2022, Mondal joined Northern Premier League Division One East club Marske United on a two-month loan. He scored six goals from six games in the first month and was then recalled. With Charman gone to a Football League club, the team were on a goalless and losing run; Mondal replaced loan striker Tyrone O'Neill and scored in Darlington's next game. After contributing to three wins and a draw, he missed a month with a hamstring injury, and finished the season with nine starts from thirteen appearances and one more goal, the winner against Leamington in April.

Unable to establish himself in Darlington's starting eleven in the new season, Mondal returned to Marske United in October 2022 on loan for a month; the club had been promoted to the Northern Premier League Premier Division in his absence.

Career statistics

References

External links
 

1997 births
Living people
People from Redcar and Cleveland
Footballers from North Yorkshire
English footballers
Association football wingers
Association football forwards
Middlesbrough F.C. players
Spennymoor Town F.C. players
Whitby Town F.C. players
Forest Green Rovers F.C. players
AFC Fylde players
Darlington F.C. players
Marske United F.C. players
English Football League players
Northern Premier League players
National League (English football) players